Gongora galeata is a species of orchid found in Mexico.

References

External links 
 
 

galeata
Orchids of Mexico